Songs from the Village is the second studio album by Jess & Matt. The album features 12 classic songs that defined a generation in the 1960s in Greenwich Village, New York.

Matt Price said: "It's 50, almost 60 years later, and these songs are just as influential as ever, and a lot of the messages – in songs like "The Times They Are a-Changin" – calling for equality, in this modern world it feels more relevant than ever. It was interesting coming back to those songs and seeing how they stood the test of time, and that the messages have come back around."

The album was announced on 14 November 2017 alongside the album's pre-order and the announcement of a national tour with Rick Price and Jack Jones.

Reception

David from auspOp said; "Most songs on this collection sit in the “classics” category... [and] to take them on is a challenge in itself, but to do so well is the other half of the battle." adding "Jess & Matt to do a really good job." David said "Matt's vocals dominate the majority of songs but it relegates Jess almost to backing vocalist duties on several songs.". He called out "The Sound of Silence" as the album highlight.

Track listing

Charts

Release history

References

2018 albums
Covers albums
Sony Music Australia albums